Arfaptin-2 is a protein that in humans is encoded by the ARFIP2 gene.

Interactions 

ARFIP2 has been shown to interact with Arf6, ARF3, ARF5 and RAC1.

References

Further reading

External links